Witikhon (Yaghnobi Ԝитихон) is a village in Sughd Region, western Tajikistan. It is part of the jamoat Anzob in the Ayni District.

References

Populated places in Sughd Region
Yaghnob